Konstantinos Ikonomou (born 16 March 1996) is a Greek professional footballer who plays as a centre-back for Slovak club Šamorín.

References

1996 births
Living people
Greek footballers
Greece youth international footballers
Greek expatriate footballers
Nemzeti Bajnokság II players
Super League Greece 2 players
Football League (Greece) players
2. Liga (Slovakia) players
SZEOL SC players
Ergotelis F.C. players
FC ŠTK 1914 Šamorín players
Association football defenders
Greek expatriate sportspeople in Slovakia
Expatriate footballers in Slovakia
Footballers from Budapest